Paracoccus is a genus of bacteria in the family Rhodobacteraceae.

Species

Accepted Species
The following species have been effectively and validly published:

 Paracoccus acridae Zhang et al. 2016
 Paracoccus aeridis Rai et al. 2020
 Paracoccus aerius Xue et al. 2017
 Paracoccus aestuarii Roh et al. 2009
 Paracoccus aestuariivivens Park et al. 2016
 Paracoccus alcaliphilus Urakami et al. 1989
 Paracoccus alimentarius Kim et al. 2018
 Paracoccus alkanivorans Zhang et al. 2020
 Paracoccus alkenifer Lipski et al. 1998
 Paracoccus aminophilus Urakami et al. 1990
 Paracoccus aminovorans Urakami et al. 1990
 Paracoccus amoyensis Lyu et al. 2021
 Paracoccus angustae Sun et al. 2015
 Paracoccus aurantiacus Ye et al. 2020
 Paracoccus bengalensis Ghosh et al. 2006
 Paracoccus caeni Lee et al. 2011
 Paracoccus carotinifaciens Tsubokura et al. 1999
 Paracoccus cavernae Dominguez-Moñino et al. 2016
 Paracoccus chinensis Li et al. 2009
 Paracoccus communis Poroshina et al. 2014
 Paracoccus contaminans Kämpfer et al. 2016
 Paracoccus denitrificans (Beijerinck and Minkman 1910) Davis 1969 (Approved Lists 1980)
 Paracoccus endophyticus Zhang et al. 2019
 Paracoccus fistulariae Kim et al. 2010
 Paracoccus fontiphilus Sheu et al. 2018
 Paracoccus haematequi Kämpfer et al. 2019
 Paracoccus haeundaensis Lee et al. 2004

 Paracoccus halophilus Liu et al. 2008
 Paracoccus halotolerans Meng et al. 2019
 Paracoccus hibisci Yan et al. 2017
 Paracoccus hibiscisoli Lin et al. 2017
 Paracoccus homiensis Kim et al. 2006
 Paracoccus huijuniae Sun et al. 2013
 Paracoccus isoporae Chen et al. 2011
 Paracoccus kocurii Ohara et al. 1990
 Paracoccus kondratievae Doronina and Trotsenko 2001
 Paracoccus koreensis La et al. 2005
 Paracoccus laeviglucosivorans Nakamura 2015
 Paracoccus liaowanqingii Li et al. 2020
 Paracoccus limosus Lee and Lee 2013
 Paracoccus litorisediminis Park et al. 2017
 Paracoccus luteus Ming et al. 2020
 Paracoccus lutimaris Jung et al. 2014
 Paracoccus mangrovi Chen et al. 2017
 Paracoccus marcusii Harker et al. 1998
 Paracoccus marinus Khan et al. 2008
 Paracoccus methylutens Doronina et al. 1998
 Paracoccus niistensis Dastager et al. 2012
 Paracoccus nototheniae Kämpfer et al. 2019
 Paracoccus pacificus Zhang et al. 2015
 Paracoccus panacisoli Nguyen et al. 2015
 Paracoccus pantotrophus (Robertson and Kuenen 1984) Rainey et al. 1999
 Paracoccus rhizosphaerae Kämpfer et al. 2012
 Paracoccus salipaludis Dong et al. 2018
 Paracoccus saliphilus Wang et al. 2009
 Paracoccus sanguinis McGinnis et al. 2015
 Paracoccus sediminilitoris Wei et al. 2019
 Paracoccus sediminis Pan et al. 2014
 Paracoccus seriniphilus Pukall et al. 2003
 Paracoccus simplex Doronina et al. 2020
 Paracoccus solventivorans Siller et al. 1996
 Paracoccus sordidisoli Singh et al. 2017
 Paracoccus sphaerophysae Deng et al. 2011
 Paracoccus stylophorae Sheu et al. 2011
 Paracoccus subflavus Zhang et al. 2019
 Paracoccus sulfuroxidans Liu et al. 2006
 Paracoccus suum Heo et al. 2019
 Paracoccus tegillarcae Lee et al. 2019
 Paracoccus thiocyanatus Katayama et al. 1996
 Paracoccus tibetensis Zhu et al. 2013
 Paracoccus versutus (Harrison 1983) Katayama et al. 1996
 Paracoccus xiamenensis Lyu et al. 2020
 Paracoccus yeei corrig. Daneshvar et al. 2003

 Paracoccus zeaxanthinifaciens Berry et al. 2003

Provisional Species
The following species have been published, but not validated according to the Bacteriological Code:
 "Paracoccus aquimaris" Kim and Lee 2015
 "Paracoccus beibuensis" Zheng et al. 2011
 "Paracoccus binzhouensis" Wang et al. 2021
 "Paracoccus ferrooxidans" Kumaraswamy et al. 2006
 "Paracoccus gahaiensis" Zhang et al. 2016
 "Paracoccus indicus" Lin et al. 2019
 "Paracoccus jeotgali" Kim et al. 2019
 "Paracoccus lichenicola" Lang et al. 2021
 "Paracoccus mutanolyticus" Buddana et al. 2016
 "Paracoccus oceanense" Fu et al. 2011
 "Paracoccus pueri" Wang et al. 2018
 "Paracoccus ravus" Yoon et al. 2019
 "Paracoccus schoinia" Takaichi et al. 2006
 "Paracoccus siganidrum" Liu et al. 2013
 "Paracoccus zhejiangensis" Wu et al. 2013

References

Further reading

Scientific journals

Scientific books

Scientific databases

External links

Rhodobacteraceae
Bacteria genera